Clark County Airport  is a county-owned public-use airport located two miles (3 km) northeast of the central business district of Clark, in Clark County, South Dakota, United States.

Facilities and aircraft 
For the 12-month period ending May 1, 2006, the airport had 2,650 aircraft operations: 94% general aviation and 6% air taxi.

References

External links 

Airports in South Dakota
Buildings and structures in Clark County, South Dakota
Transportation in Clark County, South Dakota